Corn pudding (also called pudding corn, puddin' corn, hoppy glop, or spoonbread) is a creamy culinary dish prepared from stewed corn, water, any of various thickening agents, and optional additional flavoring or texturing ingredients. It is typically used as a food staple in rural communities in the Southern United States, especially in Appalachia.

Corn pudding has sometimes been prepared using "green corn", which refers to immature ears of corn that have not fully dried. Green corn is not necessarily green in color. The cooking of the corn pulp when preparing the dish can serve to thicken it.

Corn pudding is sometimes served as a Thanksgiving dish.

Sometimes Corn pudding can be sweet, sometimes it can be savoury.

Similar dishes
Corn pudding is not to be confused with hasty pudding, which is typically made from ground corn, rather than whole kernel corn.

See also

 Bread pudding
 Creamed corn
 Corn chowder
 Cornbread
 Corn stew
 Grits
 Gruel
 List of maize dishes
 Mazamorra
 Mush (cornmeal)
 Pap (food)
 Corn custard

References

Further reading
 

Savory puddings
Maize dishes
Cuisine of the Southern United States
Dishes featuring sweet corn